Shir Levo  (born 25 June 1988) is a former football player who played most of her career in Israel including seven caps for the Israel national football team.

Personal life 
Levo was born in Timrat in northern Israel. Her parents were both athletes, her father is a sprinter and mother was ranked third in Israel for the high jump. Her brother is the actor Liron Levo.

She married Hannoch Shahaf in 2016 and together they have two children.

Career

Early career 
She began playing for the Nahalal High School team where she played midfield.

Prior to her mandatory army service, Levo played for several seasons for Bnot Caesarea Tivon.

Following her service she played for several years for Maccabi Holon. During her time at Holon, Levo won the league three times and the State Cup four times. In her first three years with the club they failed to win only one of their matches.

College career 
Levo moved to Martin Methodist College and played for the Redhawks for four years. In each year they won the TranSouth Athletic Conference championship.

Following the conclusion of her college career, Levo remained in the USA to act as an assistant coach for the Cumberland Phoenix football team.

Return to Israel 
Following her return to Israel Levo played two more seasons, one with Holon, and the other with Kiryat Gat. In her final season with Kiryat Gat she won the State Cup competition.

After retiring, Levo studied psychology and has become a sports psychologist.

National team 
Levo played seven times for the Israeli national team.

References 

1988 births
Israeli Jews
Living people
Israeli women's footballers
Israel women's international footballers
Women's association football midfielders
People from Northern District (Israel)